Brian Nicholas Cousins (born July 20, 1993) is a Canadian professional ice hockey centre for the Florida Panthers of the National Hockey League (NHL). Cousins was selected by the Philadelphia Flyers in the third round (68th overall) of the 2011 NHL Entry Draft.

Playing career

Junior
Cousins played four seasons (2009–2013) of major junior hockey with the Sault Ste. Marie Greyhounds of the Ontario Hockey League, scoring 102 goals and 189 assists for 291 points, while earning 261 penalty minutes in 264 games played. On March 26, 2012, Cousins was signed to a three-year, entry-level contract with the Philadelphia Flyers.

Professional

Philadelphia Flyers
During the 2014–15 season, on March 17, 2015, Cousins made his NHL debut in a game against the Vancouver Canucks.

Arizona Coyotes
On June 16, 2017, Cousins' five-year tenure with the Flyers ended as he was traded alongside Merrick Madsen to the Arizona Coyotes in exchange for Brendan Warren and a fifth-round choice in the 2018 NHL Entry Draft.

In establishing a bottom-six role, providing an agitating two-way presence within the Coyotes organization, Cousins recorded a career-high 27 points (7 goals, 20 assists), in 81 games in the 2018–19 season. On June 25, 2019, as an impending restricted free agent, Cousins was not tendered a qualifying offer from the Coyotes, releasing him as a free agent.

Montreal Canadiens
On July 5, 2019, Cousins signed a one-year, $1 million contract with the Montreal Canadiens. He skated in 58 games for the club, recording nine goals and 13 assists.

Vegas Golden Knights
On February 24, 2020, Montreal traded Cousins to the Vegas Golden Knights in exchange for a fourth-round selection in the 2021 NHL Entry Draft. Only two weeks after the trade was finalized, the NHL season was suspended indefinitely due to the COVID-19 pandemic. During the pause, Cousins returned to Canada and bonded with his teammates through daily FaceTime calls and other forms of long-distance communication.

Nashville Predators
Leaving the Golden Knights as a free agent, on October 9, 2020, Cousins was signed to a two-year, $3 million contract with the Nashville Predators.

Florida Panthers
Having concluded his contract with the Predators, Cousins joined his sixth NHL club, in signing as a free agent to a two-year, $2.2 million contract with the Florida Panthers on July 13, 2022.

Personal life
In 2012, while playing for the Sault Ste. Marie Greyhounds, Cousins and two teammates were arrested and charged with sexual assault of an Ontario woman. Cousins spent 12 hours in jail, followed by two weeks at the Algoma Treatment and Remand Centre for counseling before the charges were dropped by the prosecution.

Career statistics

Regular season and playoffs

International

References

External links

 

1993 births
Living people
Adirondack Phantoms players
Arizona Coyotes players
Canadian ice hockey centres
Florida Panthers players
Ice hockey people from Ontario
Lehigh Valley Phantoms players
Montreal Canadiens players
Nashville Predators players
Philadelphia Flyers draft picks
Philadelphia Flyers players
Sault Ste. Marie Greyhounds players
Sportspeople from Belleville, Ontario
Vegas Golden Knights players